The Chilkat Valley News is a weekly newspaper serving the Chilkat Valley/Haines Borough area of Southeast Alaska. The paper principally serves the communities of Haines, where it is published, and Klukwan, a Tlingit Indian village 23 miles west of Haines. 

The newspaper features local news and "Duly Noted," an about-town column penned by locals in the know. Over the years these have included Doris Ward and Heather Lende (author, National Public Radio commentator, and Anchorage Daily News columnist.) The Chilkat Valley News is also one of a handful of independently owned newspapers in Alaska. 

The newspaper was founded in 1966 by Haines schoolteacher Ray Menaker and a student printer, Bill Hartmann. The first edition appeared January 3 without a title, instead asking readers to choose a name from a list of 18 suggested ones, including Haines Independent Grapevine and Lynn Canal Drift.

Menaker sold the newspaper in the mid-1980s to Bonnie Hedrick. In 2012, Hedrick sold the paper to Tom Morphet. 

In June 2017, Kyle Clayton, the current editor and publisher, bought the paper from Morphet.

The paper is printed in Petersburg, Alaska and published on Thursdays.

The Chilkat Valley News has won numerous awards from the Alaska Press Club, including Best Weekly Newspaper in 2013 and 2014.

External links
 

1966 establishments in Alaska
Haines Borough, Alaska
Newspapers published in Alaska
Publications established in 1966
Weekly newspapers published in the United States